The 1985–86 WKU Lady Toppers basketball team represents Western Kentucky University during the 1985–86 NCAA Division I women's basketball season. The Lady Toppers were led by head coach Paul Sanderford and Sun Belt Conference Player of the Year Lillie Mason. They won the SBC season and tournament championships and received a bid to the 1986 NCAA Division I women's basketball tournament where they advanced to the Final Four. This team set a school record for wins and had three players named to All-American teams, Mason, Clemette Haskins, and Kami Thomas. Thomas and Haskins joined Mason on the All-Conference team; Mason was the SBC Tournament Most Outstanding Player (MOP) and Haskins made the All-Tournament team.  Haskins was selected to the NCAA Final Four team and Mason was NCAA East Region MOP with Thomas joining her on the All-Region team.

Schedule

|-
!colspan=6| Regular Season

|-

 

|-
!colspan=6| 1986 Sun Belt Conference women's basketball tournament

|-
!colspan=6| 1986 NCAA Division I women's basketball tournament

References

NCAA Division I women's basketball tournament Final Four seasons
Western Kentucky Lady Toppers basketball seasons
Western Kentucky
WKU Lady Toppers basketball team
WKU Lady Toppers basketball team